Matt Veldman (born August 12, 1988) is an American football tight end who is currently a free agent. He was signed by the Jaguars as an undrafted free agent in 2012. He played college football at North Dakota State. His younger brother Michael Veldman is the Quarterback for Gustavus Adolphus College.

Professional career

Jacksonville Jaguars
Veldman signed with the Jacksonville Jaguars following the 2012 NFL Draft as a rookie free agent. He spent the entire 2012 season on injured reserve. On June 11, 2013, he was released to make room on the roster for QB Mike Kafka.

Detroit Lions
Veldman signed with the Detroit Lions on June 17, 2013.  He was released from the Lions on August 27, 2013. After spending time on the Tampa Bay Buccaneers practice squad, Veldman re-signed with the Lions practice squad on December 19, 2013.

Washington Redskins
Veldman was signed by the Washington Redskins on August 14, 2014. The Redskins waived Veldman on August 26, 2014.

References

External links

Jacksonville Jaguars bio
North Dakota State Bison bio

1988 births
Living people
People from Becker, Minnesota
Players of American football from Minnesota
North Dakota State Bison football players
American football tight ends
Jacksonville Jaguars players
Tampa Bay Buccaneers players
Detroit Lions players
Washington Redskins players